Thursania is a genus of moths of the family Erebidae. The genus was described by Schaus in 1913.

Species
Thursania aristarioides Schaus, 1916 Cuba
Thursania chiriqualis Schaus, 1916 Panama
Thursania costigutta (Herrich-Schäffer, 1870) Cuba
Thursania decocta Schaus, 1913 Costa Rica
Thursania espiritualis Schaus, 1916 Brazil (Espírito Santo)
Thursania grandirenalis Schaus, 1916 Venezuela
Thursania hobsonalis Schaus, 1916 Cuba
Thursania lycas (H. Druce, 1891) Guatemala
Thursania lycimnia (H. Druce, 1891) Mexico
Thursania mallalialis Dognin, 1914 Guyana
Thursania miaralis Schaus, 1916 Cuba
Thursania ordenalis (Schaus, 1906) Brazil (São Paulo)
Thursania servilis Schaus, 1913 Costa Rica
Thursania tigurialis Schaus, 1916 Peru
Thursania voodoalis Schaus, 1916 Cuba

References

Herminiinae